The Dinengdeng Festival (English: vegetable dish), is the official festivity event of the municipality of Agoo, La Union, Philippines. It is held annually in summer in celebration of a dish by which its name is derived from. One of the main purpose of "Dinengdeng Festival" is to promote the local tourism of the town, which is one of the established Spanish settlements in the region. Replacing the old theme, one of its primary agricultural products tobacco, the festival has smoothly been identified with the municipality.

"Dinengdeng", is the Ilocano term for any vegetable-simmered dish. Usually cooked in a "banga", a local term for a cooking clay pot being used by the descendants of the local settlers in the ancient times. In fact, the "banga" is now revived to symbolize the festival. A large cooking clay pot called "Big Banga" is used during the event in cooking the main dish.

Dinengdeng Festival replaced the old event theme, Tobacco festival. The latter being too common for a festival name in the region, has been used by several municipalities, as the crop itself becomes more abundant and sometimes causes confusion as there were too many "Tobacco Festivals" in the region. The local government tried to come up with a uniqueness in its annual event, primarily to build up an identified one for the town that would promote its cultural and livelihood values. In order to lift Agoo to the line of the prominent festivities in the region, such as the Panagbenga and Bangus festivals, the event has been established.

References 

Culture of La Union
Tourist attractions in La Union
Cultural festivals in the Philippines